Janis Jonathan Blaswich (born 2 May 1991) is a German professional footballer who plays as a goalkeeper for Bundesliga club RB Leipzig.

Club career
On 15 February 2022, Blaswich signed a contract with RB Leipzig, effective from 1 July 2022 to 30 June 2025. On 20 August, he made his debut for Leipzig in a 1–2 away loss against Union Berlin. On 5 October 2022, during a Champions League matchup against Celtic, Leipzig's longtime keeper Péter Gulácsi suffered a torn ACL rupture, which would force him to miss the rest of the season. Then 3 days later, he played a full 90-minutes as a replacement in a 1–1 away draw against Mainz.

References

External links

Profile at the RB Leipzig website

1991 births
People from Viersen (district)
Sportspeople from Düsseldorf (region)
Footballers from North Rhine-Westphalia
Living people
German footballers
Association football goalkeepers
Borussia Mönchengladbach II players
Borussia Mönchengladbach players
Dynamo Dresden players
FC Hansa Rostock players
Heracles Almelo players
RB Leipzig players
Regionalliga players
3. Liga players
Eredivisie players
German expatriate footballers
Expatriate footballers in the Netherlands